Matías Paterlini (born 31 December 1977) is an Argentine cricketer who plays as an opening batsman. 

Paterlini has represented his national team since the mid 1990s. Growing up he has played cricket in his home country Argentina, as well as overseas in South Africa and England. Matias has had interest in cricket since his school-days and has represented his local cricket club St. Alban's Old Boys CC. He has played six List A games, amongst more than 250 other format matches, scoring 211 runs at an average of 42.20 with a high score 114 not out. He most recently played in the 2013 ICC World Cricket League Division Six tournament.

References

External links
 

1977 births
Living people
Argentine cricketers
Cricketers from Buenos Aires